Shrutika Arjun (b. 1986) is an Indian actress, entrepreneur and television personality who appeared in Tamil-language films. After two years of acting, she quit the entertainment industry, but returned in 2022 with the third season of the reality series Cooku with Comali, of which she emerged the winner.

Personal life 
Shrutika was born in 1986 to Sivasankar and Kalpana. Her paternal grandfather is actor Thengai Srinivasan. She studied in Adarsh Vidyalaya Higher Secondary School, Chennai. Her cousin Yogi and brother Adithya are actors. She is married to businessman Arjun, and they have one son. In 2018, Shrutika founded Haappy Herbs, an Ayurvedic skin brand.

Career 
At age 16, Shrutika was picked to star in Sri (2002) opposite Suriya. A critic noted that the two make a "nice screen pair". Her role as Ammu in the Malayalam film Swapnam Kondu Thulabharam was praised by reviewers. Shrutika also appeared in supporting roles in Tamil films Thithikudhe and Nala Damayanthi. She then left film industry to focus on her education, but said in 2020 that she was open to returning. Shrutika returned to entertainment in 2022 with the third season of the reality series Cooku with Comali, of which she emerged the winner.

Filmography 
All films are in Tamil, unless otherwise noted.

Television

References 

1987 births
21st-century Indian actresses
Actresses from Tamil Nadu
Actresses in Malayalam cinema
Actresses in Tamil cinema
Indian film actresses
Living people